The 5 miles was a track cycling event held as part of the Cycling at the 1904 Summer Olympics programme.  It was this  only time the event was held at the Olympics.  At least 10 American cyclists competed, though the precise number is unknown.

Results

Final

The top four placers are known.  5 more cyclists that did not finish the race are also known.  How many other cyclists, who they were, and what their results were, are unknown.

References

Sources

 

Cycling at the 1904 Summer Olympics
Track cycling at the 1904 Summer Olympics
Olympic track cycling events